In the National Football League (NFL), a tied game occurs when a regular season game ends with both teams having an equal score after one ten minute overtime period. Ties have counted as a half-win and half-loss in league standings since 1972; before that, ties were not counted in the standings at all. NFL teams rarely play for ties. In general, tied games in the NFL are frowned upon by both teams and fans. Tie games in the NFL were fairly common until a 1974 rule change added one 15-minute sudden death overtime period to regular-season games if they were tied after regulation. Under the original overtime rules, any score by either team in overtime would win the game. The rules were modified in 2012 to prevent a field goal from the team that won the kickoff from ending the game, and in 2017 to shorten the extra period from 15 minutes to 10 minutes for regular season games. These rule changes have slightly increased the number of tie games.

From 1920 to 1973, there were a total of 256 tied games. Since overtime was introduced in 1974, there have been 29 tied games. Five seasons (1986, 1997, 2016, 2018, and 2022) have two ties since the introduction of overtime. The most recent tie game occurred on December 4, 2022, when the New York Giants and Washington Commanders played to a 20–20 draw. The Jacksonville Jaguars, who joined the NFL in 1995, are the only current NFL team that has never recorded a tied game; the New England Patriots have never recorded a tie in an NFL game, but recorded nine ties as members of the American Football League (AFL). Including the Patriots, eight current NFL franchises in operation prior to 1974 have not recorded a tie in the overtime era. One of these eight teams, the Chicago Bears, still holds the NFL all-time record for most ties, having played 42 tied games prior to 1974. With six tied games, the Green Bay Packers have recorded the most ties since the 1974 introduction of overtime.

Tied games (1920–1973)

National Football League

From 1920 to 1973, there were no overtime rules during the NFL regular season.

American Football League (1960–1969)

Like the NFL at the time, the rival AFL did not use overtime to resolve ties during the regular season. Upon merging with the NFL in 1970, its records and history were incorporated into that of the older league.

Tied games (1974–2011)
In 1974, the NFL introduced a single sudden death 15-minute overtime period for all games that were tied at the end of regulation. During these seasons, a total of 494 regular season games went to overtime, 17 of which ended in ties.

Tied games (2012–2016)
In 2012, the league instituted a modified sudden death overtime system. A total of 83 regular season games went to overtime during these seasons, 5 of which ended in a tie.

Tied games (2017–present)
In 2017, the NFL shortened overtime from 15 minutes to 10 minutes for preseason and regular season games with the intent of reducing the risk of injury. Through the  season, a total of 88 regular season games went to overtime under these rules, 7 (7.9%) of which ended in a tie.

Tied games per team

In the following table, all American Football League records are included, but not records from leagues not incorporated into the NFL's official history such as the All-America Football Conference. Defunct NFL teams are not included. Records are currently up to date as of the end of the  regular season.

Notes
Notes

Footnotes

General references

External links
National Football League
Pro-Football-Reference.com: Years

Tied